Cicindela pulchra is a species of ground beetle of the subfamily Cicindelinae. It is found in such US states as Colorado, northwestern Oklahoma, western Kansas, and eastern Arizona. It is red in colour.

References

External links
Images of Cicindela pulchra on BugGuide

pulchra
Beetles described in 1823
Endemic fauna of the United States